Hasan Baruq (also Romanized as Ḩasan Bārūq) is a village in Balghelu Rural District, in the Central District of Ardabil County, Ardabil Province, Iran. At the 2006 census, its population was 621, with 157 families.

References 

Towns and villages in Ardabil County